Blickling Psalter, also known as Lothian Psalter, is an 8th-century Insular illuminated manuscript containing a Roman Psalter with two additional sets of Old English glosses.

The earlier of the two sets is the oldest surviving English translation of the Bible, albeit a very fragmentary one. It consists of 26 glosses, either interlinear or marginal, scattered throughout the manuscript. These so-called "red glosses" are written by a single scribe mostly in red ink in what is known as West Saxon minuscule, an Insular script found, for example, in charters of Æthelwulf, King of Wessex from 839 to 858. The glosses were first published in by E. Brock in 1876. A number of corrections were subsequently offered by Henry Sweet in 1885, and by Karl Wildhagen in 1913.

Only some of the psalms originally contained in the Blickling Psalter survive: Psalms 31.3–36.15 on folios 1–5, Psalms 36.39–50.19 on folios 6–16, and Psalm 9.9–30 on folio 64.

The Psalter is sometimes included in the Tiberius group, a group of manuscripts from Southern England stylistically related to the Tiberius Bede (such as Vespasian Psalter, Stockholm Codex Aureus, Barberini Gospels and Book of Cerne).

See also
 Old English Bible translations

Notes

References
 E. Brock (1876) The Blickling Glosses, in: Richard Morris (1876) The Blickling Homilies, Volume II, pp. 251–263
  google books preview
 
  pdf available online
 relevant plates (V–VIII) are available online between pages 24 and 25 of another article in the same volume of the journal, 
 
 
 Jane Roberts (2011) "Some Psalter Glosses in Their Immediate Context", in: Palimpsests and the Literary Imagination of Medieval England: Collected Essays, pp. 61–79 google books preview
  google books preview
  google books preview
 
 Henry Wansbrough (2008) "History and Impact of English Bible Translations", in: Hebrew Bible / Old Testament: The History of Its Interpretation: II: From the Renaissance to the Enlightenment, pp. 536–552 google books preview
 

Hiberno-Saxon manuscripts
8th-century illuminated manuscripts
Illuminated psalters
Old English